Veterans High School is a high school located in Kathleen, which is just south of Warner Robins, Georgia, United States.The school was opened on August 9, 2010, and cost about $61 million to build.  It is the fifth (fourth in the Warner Robins area) and largest school opened in the Houston County Schools system.

Sports

State Titles
Cheerleading (2) - 2013(4A), 2014(4A)

References

External links
 Veterans High School

Schools in Houston County, Georgia
Public high schools in Georgia (U.S. state)